Zen is a 1995 album recorded by French pop singer Zazie. It was her second studio album and was released on 7 January 1995. The album achieved success in francophone countries and provided five singles (two of them were only released as promotional singles): "Larsen" (#38 in France), "Zen" (#23 in France) and "" (#24 in France).

Recording
The vast majority of the lyrics and the music of the album were written and composed by Zazie. However, Pascal Obispo, Phil Baron and Vincent-Marie Bouvot also participated in this album.

"Zen" was recorded in a cellar named Unrealworld Studios, as reference to Realworld Studios of Peter Gabriel where he had recorded his first album. This album was supported by a 42-concert tours throughout France, including three shows at La Cigale in Paris.

The music video for "Larsen" was produced by Phillippe André and won the prize of 'best music video' at the 1996 Victoires de la Musique. And for the song "", it was a tribute to Serge Gainsbourg.

Track listings

Credits and personnel
 Musician
 Accordion : Phil Baron
 Acoustic guitar, background vocals : Pascal Obispo
 Bass : Nicolas Fiszman, Laurent Gueneau and Pierre Jaconelli
 Clavichord : Vic Emerson, Vincent-Marie Bouvot and Zazie
 Cristal bachet : Thomas Bloch
 Djembe, fute de pong : Nicolas Fiszman
 Drums : Nicolas Ackermann and Yvan Ackermann
 Electric guitar : Laurent Gueneau and Pierre Jaconelli
 Guitar : Michael Ohayon, Nicolas Fiszman, Stéphane Reichart, Kamil Rustam, Laurent Gueneau, Pierre Jaconelli and Vincent-Marie Bouvot
 Multi instruments : Steve Shehan
 Organ (hammond) : Jean Mora
 Organ, piano : Zazie
 Percussion, scratching : Dee Nasty
 Udu [] Yvan Ackermann
 Uillean pipes : Marc Pollier
 Strings : Vincent-Marie Bouvot

 Recording and photo
 Mixing : Nick Davis, Zazie, Phil Delire and Vincent-Marie Bouvot
 Mixing assistant : Shaun DeFeo
 Executive producer Caroline Molko
 Programming : Zazie, Vincent-Marie Bouvot and Pascal Obispo
 Photo : Youri Lenquette and Jean-Christophe Polien

Charts

Certifications and sales

References

1995 albums
Zazie albums